The Adjuster is a 1991 Canadian drama film directed by Atom Egoyan. It premiered at the New York Film Festival, and was invited to the Director's Fortnight program at the Cannes Film Festival. It is Egoyan's fourth feature film, and the first of his works to achieve international acclaim. The film has won five awards, as well as two other nominations upon its initial release. Egoyan based the film on a true story in 1989, when a fire burned down his parents' home. He realized how strange it could be for victims of a house fire to be emotionally dependent on insurance workers, which led to the inspiration for the project.

Egoyan promoted a book named after the same title as his film, The Adjuster, at a launch in Ottawa. It is a film analysis written by Tom McSorley, a head of the Canadian Film Institute. This book is part of an examination of Canadian cinema, in a series for the University of Toronto Press. The author goes into intricate depth about The Adjuster as he traces the genesis, production, and reception of the film. McSorley claims that it is a watershed film.

Synopsis
Insurance adjuster Noah Render (Elias Koteas) attempts to restore the damaged lives of his clients. His methods are unorthodox. He sleeps with most of them, puts them up in a designated hotel and quotes his profession's code like a mantra: "You may not know it yet, but you’re in shock." When another plot line with Bubba and Mimi collides with the adjuster's, the story takes a surreal turn.

This amoral yet compassionate protagonist, who lives with his film-censor wife (Arsinée Khanjian) is in a barren, unfinished suburban development. This film is one of Atom Egoyan's most strangely compelling creations. His effective use of wide-screen cinematography portrays the terrifying abyss that separates Noah from everyone he encounters.

Cast

Reception 
The film opened with generally favorable reviews. Both Roger Ebert and The New York Times''' Janet Maslin gave positive reviews for the film's initial release. It was selected as one of The New York Times' Best 1000 Movies Ever Made.

The film garnered several accolades. At the 17th Moscow International Film Festival it won the Special Silver St. George. It also won the Best Canadian Feature Film award at the 1991 Toronto International Film Festival; Egoyan accepted the award and trophy, but declined the $25,000 cheque that came with it, and instead donated the money to John Pozer, who had been the runner-up with his film The Grocer's Wife. TIFF later ranked the film tenth place in its 1990s run of the Top 10 Canadian Films of All Time. (In the updated 2004 version it was replaced by another Egoyan film, [[The Sweet Hereafter (film)|The Sweet Hereafter]], released in 1997, in the fourth place.)

The Adjuster was awarded Best Canadian Film and Best Ontario Feature at the Sudbury Cinéfest, the Special Jury Prize at the Moscow International Film Festival, and the Golden Spike at the Valladolid International Film Festival; all taken place in same year of its release in 1991.

References

External links

 
Canadian Film Encyclopedia

1991 films
1991 drama films
1991 LGBT-related films
1990s English-language films
Canadian drama films
Canadian independent films
English-language Canadian films
Films about sexual repression
Films directed by Atom Egoyan
Canadian LGBT-related films
Films scored by Mychael Danna
1991 independent films
1992 drama films
1992 films
1990s Canadian films